Mount Van der Veer is a mountain about 8 nautical miles (15 km) southeast of Mount Ronne in the Haines Mountains, Marie Byrd Land. It was mapped by the United States Antarctic Service (USAS) (1939–41), and was named by the Advisory Committee on Antarctic Names (US-ACAN) for Willard Van der Veer, a photographer with the Byrd Antarctic Expedition (1928–30).

References

Mountains of Marie Byrd Land